Tim Klüssendorf (born 16 August 1991) is a German economist and politician of the Social Democratic Party of Germany who has been serving as the member of the Bundestag for Lübeck in the 2021 German federal election.

Early life 
Klüssendorf was born in Lübeck. He studied economics and business administration at the University of Hamburg.

Political career 
From 2013 until 2018, Klüssendorf was a member of the City Council of Lübeck.

Klüssendorf defeated Claudia Schmidtke in the 2021 German federal election. In parliament, he has since been serving on the Finance Committee.

Within his parliamentary group, Klüssendorf belongs to the Parliamentary Left, a left-wing movement.

Other activities 
 VfB Lübeck, Member of the Supervisory Board (since 2021)
 German United Services Trade Union (ver.di), Member

References 

Living people
1991 births
People from Lübeck
21st-century German politicians
Members of the Bundestag for Schleswig-Holstein
Members of the Bundestag 2021–2025
Members of the Bundestag for the Social Democratic Party of Germany